Hanumanthuwaka is an area of Visakhapatnam, Andhra Pradesh, India. The Visakhapatnam BRTS connects Hanumanthuwaka to Simhachalam. Hanumanthuwaka was an initially a small suburb outside Visakhapatnam.

Landmark
Famous tourist spot in Visakhapatnam City Kailasagiri is located in this area.

Hospitals
Visakha Institute of Medical Sciences(VIMS) and L.V. Prasad Eye Hospital is located here.

Transport
Hanumanthuwaka is connected by the National Highway.  It is one of the busiest junctions in the city as NH 16 passes through here. Buses are run by the state-owned APSRTC, and is well connected to all parts of Visakhapatnam. All buses going to Arilova, Thagarapuvalasa, Bheemili pass through here.

References

Neighbourhoods in Visakhapatnam